KMML (92.9 FM) is a radio station licensed to Cimarron, Kansas, United States. The station is currently owned by Nancy Miller and William Wachter, through licensee One Media, Inc.

The KMML callsign was previously used in Amarillo, Texas by Mel Tillis for a country station broadcasting on 98.7 MHz acquired in 1983, moved to 96.9 MHz 1993–2007.

On December 2, 2019, KMML's local marketing agreement with Rocking M Media ended and the regional Mexican format moved to KZRD, with KMML going silent. In November 2020, KMML began simulcasting KWKR Leoti's mainstream rock format.

Previous logo

References

External links

MML
1983 establishments in Kansas
Radio stations established in 1983
Gray County, Kansas